Coleophora honshuella is a moth of the family Coleophoridae. It is found on Honshu island in Japan and Korea.

Adults are on wing from late July to early August.

The larvae feed on the leaves of Artemisia princeps. They create a large transparent blotch-mine in June. When fully fed, they fasten their case on the lower part of the stalk of the host plant.

References

honshuella
Moths described in 1988
Moths of Asia